The Deputy is an American Western series starring Henry Fonda that aired on NBC from 1959 to 1961. Fonda portrayed Chief Marshal Simon Fry of the Arizona Territory and Allen Case played Deputy Clay McCord, a storekeeper who tried to avoid using a gun.

Synopsis

Fonda narrated most episodes and appeared briefly at the beginning and ending of most segments. He played the lead in only six episodes in the first season and 13 in the second. Usually, he gave his deputy the assignment, and on rare occasions,  thanked him at the conclusion of the episode. As Fred MacMurray did while shooting the sitcom series My Three Sons, Fonda performed all of his work on The Deputy in several lengthy sessions, so as to leave himself free for other projects. Although based in Silver City, the marshal's district also covered several nearby towns. Deputy McCord was a storekeeper who bore arms with great reluctance. Wallace Ford appeared as the elderly marshal, Herk Lamson, with Betty Lou Keim as McCord's sister, Fran, in the first season. Read Morgan joined the show in the second season as Sergeant Hapgood Tasker, known as "Sarge", a one-eyed United States Army cavalry enlisted man stationed in town. Gary Hunley played as Deputy Clay McCord's young brother Brandon McCord in an episode of the television series.

Cast
 Henry Fonda as Chief Marshal Simon Fry
 Allen Case as Deputy Clay McCord
 Read Morgan as Sergeant Hapgood Tasker
 Wallace Ford as Marshal Herk Lamson
 Betty Lou Keim as Fran McCord

Recurring cast
Vito Scotti as Jose
Addison Richards as Doc Landy

Episodes

Season 1

Season 2

Production notes
The series was created by Roland Kibbee and Norman Lear, produced by Revue Studios, and featured a jazz guitar score by Jack Marshall.  It was the first television series that involved Lear as a creator or executive producer.

The Deputy aired at 9 pm Eastern on Saturdays.

Original tie-in novel
An original, licensed novel, based on the TV series concept and characters, was issued in paperback by Dell Publishing. The book was titled simply The Deputy, after the series; the author was veteran Western novelist Roe Richmond; the publication date was September, 1960; and the cover illustration, featuring Henry Fonda and Allan Case, was a painting by John Leone. The cover price was 35¢.

Bantam Books reissued the novel in 1986, as a non-tie-in, paperback edition, displaying no stated connection to the TV series whatsoever, under the title The Saga of Simon Fry. The cover price was $2.75. The circumstances behind the reprint are unknown.

Home media
On October 26, 2010, Timeless Media Group released the complete series on DVD in Region 1.  The 12-disc set features all 76 episodes of the series.

References

External links
 

1959 American television series debuts
1961 American television series endings
English-language television shows
NBC original programming
Black-and-white American television shows
Television shows set in Arizona
Television series by Universal Television
Television series created by Norman Lear
1950s Western (genre) television series
1960s Western (genre) television series